Timmy Dennis Mario Thiele (born 31 July 1991) is a German professional footballer who plays as a forward.

Career
Thiele scored his first goal for Burton Albion in a 5–1 win over Colchester United on 28 November 2015. He joined Oldham Athletic on loan in March 2016. He was released by Burton Albion at the end of the 2015–16 season.

During the summer of 2016 he joined Regionalliga Nordost side FC Carl Zeiss Jena.

In June 2018, Thiele left Jena for league rivals 1. FC Kaiserslautern. The transfer fee paid to Jena was reported as €400,000 plus possible bonuses.

Thiele moved to FC Viktoria Köln in August 2020.

Career statistics

References

External links
 
 

Living people
1991 births
Association football forwards
German footballers
Footballers from Berlin
3. Liga players
Regionalliga players
English Football League players
SV Werder Bremen II players
FC Schalke 04 II players
Borussia Dortmund II players
Alemannia Aachen players
SC Wiedenbrück 2000 players
Burton Albion F.C. players
Oldham Athletic A.F.C. players
FC Carl Zeiss Jena players
1. FC Kaiserslautern players
FC Viktoria Köln players